Oberea deficiens is a species of beetle in the family Cerambycidae. It was described by Thomas Lincoln Casey, Jr. in 1924. It is known from Canada.

References

deficiens
Beetles described in 1924
Taxa named by Thomas Lincoln Casey Jr.